Nélson António Soares da Gama (born 2 August 1972 in Bissau, Portuguese Guinea), commonly known as Toni, is a Portuguese former professional footballer who played as a striker.

References

External links

1972 births
Living people
Bissau-Guinean emigrants to Portugal
Sportspeople from Bissau
Bissau-Guinean footballers
Portuguese footballers
Association football forwards
Primeira Liga players
Liga Portugal 2 players
Segunda Divisão players
FC Porto players
S.C. Braga players
S.C. Beira-Mar players
S.C. Salgueiros players
C.S. Marítimo players
Leça F.C. players
Segunda División B players
Burgos CF footballers
Portugal youth international footballers
Portugal under-21 international footballers
Portuguese expatriate footballers
Expatriate footballers in Spain
Expatriate footballers in Luxembourg
Portuguese expatriate sportspeople in Spain
Portuguese expatriate sportspeople in Luxembourg